Kek or KEK may refer to:

Places
 Kék, a village in eastern Hungary
 Ekwok Airport (IATA: KEK), an airport in Ekwok, Alaska

People
 Franci Kek (born 1964), Slovenian politician and actor
 Matjaž Kek (born 1961), Slovenian footballer and manager
 Hakka people, also known as Kek, Khek or Khek-ka

Organizations
 KEK is a Japanese particle physics research organization.
 Party of Greek Hunters, a Greek political party
 KF KEK, a football club based in Obilić, Kosovo

Other uses
 Kek (mythology), Egyptian god
 Q'eqchi' language (ISO 639-3: kek), a Mayan language
 Key encryption key, a cryptographic term
 "Kek", a song by singer Nil Karaibrahimgil in her album Nil Dünyası
 "Kek", or "kekeke"/"ㅋㅋㅋ", a Korean onomatopoeia of laughter used similarly to "LOL"
 Cult of Kek, a parody religion worshipping Pepe the Frog and the fictitious country of "Kekistan", associated with alt-right politics

See also
 KEKS, a Kansas radio station
 Leibniz-Keks, a German biscuit brand
 Keck (disambiguation)

Religious parodies and satires